Daystate is a British manufacturer of air rifles based in Eccleshall, Staffordshire.

History
The enterprise was founded in 1978 by Don Lowndes, Jim Phillips, Ken Gibbon and Mike Seddon with the aim of making tranquillizer guns for pest control purposes. The first product was the Air Ranger.

In 1980, Daystate was commissioned by Rentokil to manufacture a small bore rifle for pest control, this model was named the Huntsman and is in manufacture until today.

In the mid-1980s, Daystate was building PCP air rifles for the general public, at this time all rifles were built by hand.

Product Lines
Daystate currently produce 9 core products with various options in terms of caliber, stock and finish.

Current Models
 Pulsar (replaced by delta wolf)
 Wolverine2
 Wolverine R
 Renegade R
 HR Huntsman Regal
 Huntsman Revere
 Griffin
 Tsar
 Red Wolf
 Delta Wolf

Past Models
CR-94
CR-97 and SE
CR-X SE and ST
Harrier and SE
Harrier X
LR90
Merlyn
MK4
MK3
PH6
Wolverine
X2
Mirage
Grand Prix
2000
QC
Huntsman FTR
Competa target pistol
Airwolf CDT 
Airwolf MCT 
Air Ranger

References

Pneumatic weapons
Hunting equipment